Zir Anay-e Sofla (also Romanized as Zīr ‘Anāy-e Soflá; also known as Zīr ‘Anā’-e Ābī) is a village in Poshtkuh-e Rostam Rural District, Sorna District, Rostam County, Fars Province, Iran. At the 2006 census, its population was 57, distributed in 10 families.

References 

Populated places in Rostam County